"Jalousi" is a song performed by Danish pop, dance and R&B singer and songwriter Medina. It was released on 3 February 2014 as a digital download in Denmark as the lead single from her debut live album Tæt På - Live (2014). The song peaked at number 1 on the Danish Singles Chart.

Music video
A music video to accompany the release of "Jalousi" was first released onto YouTube on 3 February 2014 at a total length of three minutes and fifty-four seconds. The video was directed by Amar & Waqas.

Track listing

Chart performance

Weekly charts

Release history

References

2014 singles
Universal Music Group singles
2014 songs
Number-one singles in Denmark
Songs written by Medina (singer)
Medina (singer) songs